CBS-0550 is a drug developed by Taisho Pharmaceutical, which acts as a potent and selective cannabinoid CB2 receptor agonist, with 1400x selectivity for CB2 over the related CB1 receptor. Unlike most cannabinoid agonists, CBS-0550 has good solubility in water, and in animal studies it was found to produce analgesic and anti-hyperalgesic effects. A number of related compounds have been developed with similar properties.

See also 
 A-836,339
 SER-601

References 

Cannabinoids
Tert-butyl compounds
Cyclopropanes
Fluoroarenes
Trifluoromethyl compounds
Pyrazoles